Outpost Nunataks are three aligned nunataks standing 4 nautical miles (7km) southwest of Brimstone Peak in the Prince Albert Mountains, Victoria Land. It was mapped by the Southern Party of the New Zealand Geological Survey Antarctic Expedition (NZGSAE), 1962–63, and presumably named by the party because of the position of the nunataks near the edge of the polar plateau.

Nunataks of Oates Land